Brendon Davids (born 4 February 1993 in Pietermaritzburg) is a South African cyclist, who currently rides for UCI Continental team .

Major results

2011
 1st Junior cross-country, African Mountain Bike Championships
2013
 1st Under-23 cross-country, African Mountain Bike Championships
2014
 2nd Under-23 cross-country, African Mountain Bike Championships
2017
 1st  Overall Jelajah Malaysia
1st Stage 3
 1st  Overall 
1st Stage 3
 2nd Overall 
1st Stage 6
 10th Time trial, National Road Championships
2018
 7th Overall Tour de Langkawi
2019
 2nd Overall PRUride Philippines
1st  Points classification
1st Stage 2
 2nd Overall Tour of Gippsland
2021
 4th Peaks Challenge Falls Creek

References

External links

1993 births
Living people
South African male cyclists